Luvena Buchanan Vysekal (née Luvena Buchanan, pseudonym Benjamin Blue; December 23, 1873 – January 11, 1954) was an American portrait painter.

Biography 
She was born December 23, 1873, in Le Mars, Iowa, her parents were Scottish.

She was trained at the Art Institute of Chicago between 1910 and 1914, where her future husband Edouard Vysekal was one of her professors. They married in 1914, and moved to Southern California. She later opened a studio on the Sunset Strip in Los Angeles, California.
In 1895 she used the alias of Hattie Lummis and wrote a poem for a song prize commissioned by the Wabash Railboard, which became "In the Shadow of the Pines," later performed by the Carter Family and Bascom Lamar Lunsford.
She used the pseudonym "Benjamin Blue" to publish a 1922 book, Counterfeit Presentations.

Further reading

References

1873 births
1954 deaths
School of the Art Institute of Chicago alumni
American portrait painters
American women painters
Artists from Los Angeles
Painters from California
20th-century American painters
People from Le Mars, Iowa
20th-century American women artists